The Load is a 2018 Serbian war drama film directed by Ognjen Glavonić. It was selected to screen in the Directors' Fortnight section at the 2018 Cannes Film Festival. It also won the Golden Pram Award for Best Feature Film at the 2018 Zagreb Film Festival.

Plot 

During the 1999 NATO bombing of Kosovo, Vlada is a middle aged man hired to act as a courier to Belgrade through Kosovo of a mysterious truck transport, the contents of which are left undisclosed to him. This being his third excursion driving, he’s advised not to stop for any reason once he departs. After being dropped off at the site where the truck waits for him, he begins his journey but is soon rerouted by a burning car wreck at a bridge, forcing him to detour to a nearby riverbed.

He finds a group of refugees who give directions and one sells him cigarettes. A young man named Paja approaches him asking to ride with him to Belgrade, but he refuses. Despite Paja propositioning him with being able to navigate the countryside to Belgrade, he still denies him and departs. 
Once on the road, he realizes Paja has hitched a ride by standing on the back of the truck and after pulling over, Paja begs him to join once more since he’s freezing outside, which Vlada quietly allows him.

During their journey, the 2 witness the ravages of war torn Kosovo and learn about each other, both coming from upstanding traditional background but otherwise being very different. Paja shares the music he’s made with his band via cassette and headphones, which Vlada commends him on. After admitting to Paja he doesn’t know (nor does he want to know), what’s being transported, as well as narrowly avoiding apprehension by law enforcement, Paja decides to depart the truck short of Belgrade. Before leaving Paja gives him the cassette and tells him to reach out should he ever want to join him. He’s last shown on his own in a decrepit playground as nightfall surrounds him with nowhere to go.

Vlada arrives at his destination successfully and is compensated. As he makes his way through a government office building where he makes a phone call and decompresses, he sees through a window soldiers unloading dead bodies from the truck and piling them in to a mass grave.

He sleeps on a waiting area couch in the building and is woken up by an officer who is involved in the transport who orders him to return the truck after washing the cargo hold.

He returns to his wife and teenage son Ivan to discuss what their options are with the bombings continuing for an indeterminate time. He makes attempts to bond with his son but finds that he is emotionally estranged from him. After telling Ivan the story of how his father and uncle were affected by World War II, he gives Him the cassette tape, which Ivan is seen listening to with a friend, closing the film saying “I want to start a band.”

Cast
 Leon Lučev as Vlada
 Pavle Čemerikić
 Tamara Krcunović
 Ivan Lučev
 Igor Benčina

Reception

Critical response 

The site's critics' consensus reads: "The Load (Teret) sifts through the wreckage of a horrific conflict to tell the story of a man faced with impossible choices -- and their consequences." Metacritic reports an aggregated score of 75/100 based on 8 critics, indicating "generally favorable reviews".

Accolades

References

External links
 

2018 films
2010s Serbian-language films
Serbian war drama films
Yugoslav Wars films
Works about the Kosovo War
Films set in Serbia
2018 war drama films
Films set in Kosovo
2018 drama films
Films set in Belgrade
Films shot in Serbia
Films shot in Belgrade